Dwight Stewart (born September 2, 1971) is a former American professional basketball player and a member of the University of Arkansas Razorbacks 1994 NCAA champion men's basketball team.

A 6-foot-9, 260-pound center, Stewart played professionally around the world including leagues in Iceland, Macedonia, Poland, Yugoslavia, Spain, Puerto Rico, Uruguay, and Venezuela.

Playing career
Stewart won the 1994 NCAA championship with Arkansas. In 1995, he helped the team return to the championship game after scoring 15 points, including a 55-foot three pointer at the half time buzzer, in a win against North Carolina in the Final Four.

In February 1996, Stewart signed with Keflavík of the Icelandic Úrvalsdeild karla. In 3 regular season games, he averaged 19.3 points and 11.7 rebounds. In the playoffs he helped Keflavík reach the Úrvalsdeild finals where it eventually lost to rivals Grindavík. In 13 playoffs games, Stewart averaged 13.2 points and 10.6 rebounds.

Notes

External links
Profile at Eurobasket.com
Úrvalsdeild karla statistics at Icelandic Basketball Association
College statistics at Sports Reference

1971 births
Living people
20th-century African-American sportspeople
21st-century African-American sportspeople
African-American basketball players
American expatriate basketball people in Iceland
American expatriate basketball people in North Macedonia
American expatriate basketball people in Poland
American expatriate basketball people in Serbia
American expatriate basketball people in Spain
American expatriate basketball people in Uruguay
American expatriate basketball people in Venezuela
American men's basketball players
Arkansas Razorbacks men's basketball players
Basketball players from Tennessee
Centers (basketball)
Keflavík men's basketball players
KK Crvena zvezda players
Power forwards (basketball)
San Diego Wildcards players
South Plains Texans basketball players
Úrvalsdeild karla (basketball) players